Eupatorus siamensis is an endemic species of rhinoceros beetle in Isan, Thailand.

Dynastinae
Beetles described in 1867